Betul is a coastal village located in South Goa District, Goa, India, known for its Betul beach. It is one hour distance from Margao. The Sal river drains into the Arabian sea near Betul. The village is also home to the Betul Fort.

The Fort was built during the regime of Chattrapati Shivaji Maharaj and was a part of Swarajya (Maratha Administration and Control).

External links

Cities and towns in South Goa district